Martin is an unincorporated community in northeastern Clay Township, Ottawa County, Ohio, United States.  It has a post office with the ZIP code 43445.

References

Unincorporated communities in Ottawa County, Ohio
Unincorporated communities in Ohio